The 1989 Indian general election polls in Tamil Nadu were held for 39 seats in the state. The result was a landslide victory for Indian National Congress, and its ally All India Anna Dravida Munnetra Kazhagam, winning 38 out of 39 seats. This election marked the dominance of INC-AIADMK in Tamil Nadu, till 1996. The opposition party Dravida Munnetra Kazhagam failed to win a single seat, resulting in the party's downturn in national and state politics for the coming years. Because National Front won at the national level, Rajya Sabha member Murasoli Maran got a cabinet berth in the new V. P. Singh administration.

Voting and results

Results by Alliance

 The two seats won in 1984 represents seats won by DMK.

List of Elected MPs

Post-election Union Council of Ministers from Tamil Nadu
Source: New York Times
Due to the fact, that the DMK-JD were routed in Tamil Nadu, VP Singh had to choose Rajya Sabha member, Murasoli Maran to represent Tamil Nadu in his cabinet.

Cabinet Ministers

See also 
Elections in Tamil Nadu

Bibliography 
Volume I, 1989 Indian general election, 9th Lok Sabha

References

External links
 Website of Election Commission of India
 CNN-IBN Lok Sabha Election History

1989 Indian general election
Indian general elections in Tamil Nadu
1980s in Tamil Nadu